The Sorell Football Club, nicknamed the Eagles, is an Australian rules football club currently playing in the Southern Football League in Tasmania, Australia. In 2022 the Eagles made finals for the first time in 12 years, finishing 5th on the ladder. They were subsequently knocked out by Dodges Ferry in the first week of finals. Nic Baker took out the 2022 best and fairest count followed by runner up Jacob Smith who also was the leading goal kicker for the year with 50 goals.

Origins 
The Sorell Football Club was founded in 1883 and originally played in the South Eastern District Football Association (SEDFA) until 1962.  
In 1963 the Eagles joined the TAFL (Southern Division) where they won three premiership titles in 1966, 1983 and their most recent premiership in 1990, they remained a member of that competition until the League collapsed at the end of the 1995 season. 
In the 1990s Sorell switched from playing in their traditional Red, White and Black playing uniform to a West Coast Eagles-style Blue and Gold uniform which they currently still use. 
Since 1996 Sorell have been a member of the STFL/SFL and were a participating club in the SFL Regional League when the competition split into two divisions (2002-2008) apart from 2002 when the club played in the SFL Premier League and in 2003 when the club went into recess for one season due to a lack of volunteers to run the club before rejoining the Regional League in 2004. 
Sorell's time in the SFL has seen little success, the Eagles' have made the finals a number of times and participated in two grand finals which resulted in a 77-point drubbing at the hands of Cygnet in 2004 and a narrow 10-point loss to South-Eastern rival, Dodges Ferry in 2006. 
The club is based in a growing semi-rural township 27 km east of Hobart and takes in many small towns in its district, they play their home matches at Pembroke Park, where they have been based since 1992. 
Previously the club played its home matches at the Sorell Memorial Oval from 1967-1991 until they were ejected by the Sorell Council, prior to that they played their matches at the Sorell Racecourse Ground (where Pembroke Park stands today) until 1966 when it was destroyed by fire in the 1967 bushfires.

Entered STFL/SFL 
1996

STFL/SFL Premierships 
Nil

STFL/SFL Runner Up 
2004, 2006

TAFL (Southern Division) Premierships 
1966, 1983, 1990

State Amateur Premierships – Condor Shield 
1966

South Eastern District FA Premierships 
1960, 1961, 1962

Clarence Sub-Districts FA Premierships 
1952

Pembroke FA Premierships 
1937, 1938, 1939

Walter Howard Medal winners 
(Best and fairest player in the TAFL (Southern Division) 
1968 – Graeme Jones 
1982 – Lindsey White 
1987 – Lindsey White 
1988 – Michael Waller 
1990 – Michael Waller 
1991 – M. Kerslake

Games record holder 
Mark Clothier (410 games)

References

External links
 Southern Football League

Australian rules football clubs in Tasmania
1883 establishments in Australia
Australian rules football clubs established in 1883